Wellspring, founded as Wellspring Worldwide in 2003 by husband and wife team Robert and Sandi Lowe, is a provider of web-based software systems for managing the research and technology commercialization of universities, companies, government agencies, and independent labs.

History
Wellspring was founded in 2003 and spun-out of Carnegie Mellon University, initially providing software systems, consulting services and training programs for university technology transfer offices in North America and Europe.

Wellspring had European operations in Lisbon, Portugal from 2006-2008 and in Cambridge, United Kingdom from 2008-2011.

In 2007, Wellspring launched a services program in partnership with Carnegie Mellon University to help incubate university-based start-up companies following it up with the 2008 launch of the Sophia Knowledge Management System and a Technology Gateway to allow universities to market research projects and intellectual property available for licensing.

In January 2010, Wellspring acquired Flintbox, a company founded in 2003 at the University of British Columbia to provide a location for universities to post available research projects and intellectual property. Flintbox also provided the technology behind Kauffman's iBridge Network. This acquisition was followed in 2011 by the acquisition of online intellectual property marketing site FolioDirect.

Wellspring Worldwide secured PPP loan from the SBA of $889,700.00 in April, 2020 which was forgiven. Protecting 45 jobs and an estimated annual payroll of $4.27 million. 

https://www.federalpay.org/paycheck-protection-program/wellspring-worldwide-inc-chicago-il

https://www.usaspending.gov/search/?hash=bf7c01f20c77ca794a9463d4be628725

https://pubkgroup.com/law/protester-cannot-fault-agency-for-failing-to-find-a-flaw-in-its-price-proposal-wellspring-worldwide-inc-gao-b-417282-2-et-al/

Products
Wellspring has two main products, Sophia and Flintbox.

Sophia
Sophia is a software platform that links together projects, inventions, platforms, publications, patents, copyrights and more according to the requirements of the user.

Flintbox

Flintbox provides a platform for intellectual property exchange between companies, universities and independent innovators.

Wellspring Worldwide secured PPP loan from the SBA of $889,700.00 in April, 2020 which was forgiven. Protecting 45 jobs and an estimated annual payroll of $4.27 million. 

https://www.federalpay.org/paycheck-protection-program/wellspring-worldwide-inc-chicago-il

https://www.usaspending.gov/search/?hash=bf7c01f20c77ca794a9463d4be628725

https://mysite.flintbox.com/terms

Awards and recognition
2010 – Named 2nd fastest growing technology company in Western Pennsylvania by the Pittsburgh Business Times. (1st  among software companies)
2010 – Named One of the Best Places to Work by the Pittsburgh Business Times.

References

External links
Wellspring Website

Technology companies of the United States
Companies based in Chicago
Companies established in 2003